A Comedy of Terrors is  a historical novel by British writer Lindsey Davis, the ninth  in her Flavia Albia series. It was published in the UK on 1 April 2021 by Hodder & Stoughton and is scheduled to be published in the United States on 27 July 2021 by Minotaur Books. 

The novel is set in 89 AD, starting during "the week before Saturnalia: 12-17 December". It features nuts ("both the snack and missile of choice of tipsy celebrants") and threats to the emperor ("Domitian himself is a target for the old criminals' new schemes").

Falco and his wife Helena appear in the list of "Our festival characters", described as "her [Flavia Albia's] iconic parents".

References
 

Novels set in ancient Rome
British historical novels
Flavia Albia novels
2021 British novels
21st-century British novels
Hodder & Stoughton books
Novels set in the 1st century
89